The Rolling Stones, an English rock band, have been active since 1962. Originally a counterpoint to The Beatles, the group took influences from the Blues, rock'n'roll and R&B. Most of their recordings feature a core of drums, bass, two guitars and a lead vocal, though there have been numerous variations on this in the studio.

Keith Richards 

Keith Richards used a Harmony H72 Meteor on early tours, before switching to an Epiphone Casino. After the Stones became successful in the US, Richards acquired a Gibson Firebird and a 1959 Les Paul with a Bigsby Vibrato system. He used this Les Paul live, switching to a Custom model in 1966. Richards' use of the Les Paul in a British rock band helped popularise the model and ultimately lead to production resuming.

In the late 1960s, Richards played a three pickup Les Paul Custom and began to use Fender Telecasters. For The Stones in the Park, he played an Epiphone Casino and a Gibson Flying V. On the late 1969 tour he acquired an Ampeg Dan Armstrong model and he used this during the live recording of Get Yer Ya-Ya's Out!.

From 1970 onwards, Richards began using Telecasters as his main onstage guitar. His favourite model is nicknamed "Micawber" which he received on his 27th birthday (18 December) as a gift from Eric Clapton. Richards replaced the original stock single-coil neck pickup with a Gibson PAF humbucking pickup in 1972. He used several other Telecasters on tours and in the studio but primarily the Telecaster Deluxe and a so-called "Hot Rod" Telecaster. The Deluxe was used on the Exile On Main Street tours and Richards was featured in a Fender advertisement promoting the model. The "Hot Rod" Tele was used on the Love You Live album in the songs with Open G tuning. Since 1980, Richards has used other guitars besides the Telecaster, including a Les Paul Junior and Gibson ES-335.

Brian Jones

Guitars 
Brian Jones used a Harmony Stratotone in the early days of the Stones playing the Blues clubs, replacing it with a Gretsch Double anniversary in two tone green. He used this up until 1965 when he switched to a Vox Prototype Mark IV or "Teardrop" guitar, which is the guitar he is most commonly associated with. He also used a Gibson Firebird, a Gretsch White Falcon, Les Paul, Rickenbacker 360/12 and a Telecaster.

Other instruments 
Jones played the harmonica in the group's early days, and doubled on piano and slide guitar. He played a variety of other instruments, particularly in the studio, including sitar on "Street Fighting Man" and "Paint It, Black", organ on "2000 Man" and "Let's Spend the Night Together", marimba on "Under My Thumb", "Out Of Time" and "Yesterday's Papers", recorder on "Ruby Tuesday", trumpet on "Child of the Moon", Appalachian dulcimer on "I Am Waiting" and "Lady Jane", and oboe and saxophone on "Dandelion". 

Jones played the Mellotron on several Stones tracks, including the single "We Love You" and the albums Their Satanic Majesties Request and Beggars Banquet. On his final recordings for the Stones he used an autoharp on "You've Got The Silver". 

In the group's early career, Jones sang backing vocals before Richards primarily took over that role.

Mick Taylor 

Mick Taylor used a Gibson SG for the 1969 Hyde Park gig and the US tour late that year. For most of his time with the Stones, he used a sunburst Les Paul.

Bill Wyman 
Bill Wyman had a distinctive way of holding the bass, holding it upright as if to emulate a double bass. In the group's early days he used a Framus Star bass before swapping to a  Vox "Teardrop" bass in 1964. From 1967 onward, he alternated between Fender Mustang and Dan Armstrong basses.

Charlie Watts 

Charlie Watts' background is in jazz drumming, and his kit reflects this style. Throughout his career he has used a Gretsch 1956-7 Round Badge kit with a 22" Bass Drum, 16" Floor Tom, 12" Tom and a 5-by-14-inch snare. He has used a variety of cymbals, including an 18" UFIP Natural Series Fast China, a UFIP Rough Series China with rivets, a very old UFIP Flat Ride and an Avedis Zildjian Swish.

References 

Citations

Further reading

 

The Rolling Stones